Normanby, North Yorkshire could refer to:

Normanby, Redcar and Cleveland
Normanby, Ryedale